The International Bank Account Number (IBAN) is an internationally agreed system of identifying bank accounts across national borders to facilitate the communication and processing of cross border transactions with a reduced risk of transcription errors. An IBAN uniquely identifies the account of a customer at a financial institution. It was originally adopted by the European Committee for Banking Standards (ECBS) and since 1997 as the international standard ISO 13616 under the International Organization for Standardization (ISO). The current version is ISO 13616:2020, which indicates the Society for Worldwide Interbank Financial Telecommunication (SWIFT) as the formal registrar. Initially developed to facilitate payments within the European Union, it has been implemented by most European countries and numerous countries in other parts of the world, mainly in the Middle East and the Caribbean. As of May 2020, 77 countries were using the IBAN numbering system.

The IBAN consists of up to 34 alphanumeric characters comprising a country code; two check digits; and a number that includes the domestic bank account number, branch identifier, and potential routing information. The check digits enable a check of the bank account number to confirm its integrity before submitting a transaction.

Background
Before IBAN, differing national standards for bank account identification (i.e. bank, branch, routing codes, and account number) were confusing for some users. This often led to necessary routing information being missing from payments. Routing information as specified by ISO 9362 (also known as Business Identifier Codes (BIC), SWIFT ID or SWIFT code, and SWIFT-BIC) does not require a specific format for the transaction so the identification of accounts and transaction types is left to agreements of the transaction partners. It also does not contain check digits, so errors of transcription were not detectable and it was not possible for a sending bank to validate the routing information prior to submitting the payment. Routing errors caused delayed payments and incurred extra costs to the sending and receiving banks and often to intermediate routing banks.

In 1997, to overcome these difficulties, the International Organization for Standardization (ISO) published ISO 13616:1997. This proposal had a degree of flexibility that the European Committee for Banking Standards (ECBS) believed would make it unworkable, and they produced a "slimmed down" version of the standard which, amongst other things, permitted only upper-case letters and required that the IBAN for each country have a fixed length. ISO 13616:1997 was subsequently withdrawn and replaced by ISO 13616:2003. The standard was revised again in 2007 when it was split into two parts. ISO 13616-1:2007 "specifies the elements of an international bank account number (IBAN) used to facilitate the processing of data internationally in data interchange, in financial environments as well as within and between other industries" but "does not specify internal procedures, file organization techniques, storage media, languages, etc. to be used in its implementation". ISO 13616-2:2007 describes "the Registration Authority (RA) responsible for the registry of IBAN formats that are compliant with ISO 13616-1 [and] the procedures for registering ISO 13616-compliant IBAN formats". The official IBAN registrar under ISO 13616-2:2007 is SWIFT.

IBAN imposes a flexible but regular format sufficient for account identification and contains validation information to avoid errors of transcription. It carries all the routing information needed to get a payment from one bank to another wherever it may be; it contains key bank account details such as country code, branch codes (known as sort codes in the UK and Ireland) and account numbers, and it contains check digits which can be validated at source according to a single standard procedure. Where used, IBANs have reduced trans-national money transfer errors to under 0.1% of total payments

Structure

The IBAN consists of up to 34 alphanumeric characters, as follows:
 country code using ISO 3166-1 alpha-2 – two letters,
 check digits – two digits, and
 Basic Bank Account Number (BBAN) – up to 30 alphanumeric characters that are country-specific.

The check digits represent the checksum of the bank account number which is used by banking systems to confirm that the number contains no simple errors.

In order to facilitate reading by humans, IBANs are traditionally expressed in groups of four characters separated by spaces, the last group being of variable length as shown in the example below; when transmitted electronically however spaces are omitted.

Permitted IBAN characters are the digits 0 to 9 and the 26 Latin alphabetic characters A to Z. This applies even in countries where these characters are not used in the national language (e.g. Greece).

Basic Bank Account Number
The Basic Bank Account Number (BBAN) format is decided by the national central bank or designated payment authority of each country. There is no consistency between the formats adopted. The national authority may register its BBAN format with SWIFT but is not obliged to do so. It may adopt IBAN without registration. SWIFT also acts as the registration authority for the SWIFT system, which is used by most countries that have not adopted IBAN. A major difference between the two systems is that under SWIFT there is no requirement that BBANs used within a country be of a pre-defined length.

The BBAN must be of a fixed length for the country and comprise case-insensitive alphanumeric characters. It includes the domestic bank account number, branch identifier, and potential routing information. Each country can have a different national routing/account numbering system, up to a maximum of 30 alphanumeric characters.

Check digits
The check digits enable the sending bank (or its customer) to perform a sanity check of the routing destination and account number from a single string of data at the time of data entry. This check is guaranteed to detect any instances where a single character has been omitted, duplicated, mistyped or where two characters have been transposed. Thus routing and account number errors are virtually eliminated.

Processing
One of the design aims of the IBAN was to enable as much validation as possible to be done at the point of data entry. In particular, the computer program that accepts an IBAN will be able to validate:
 Country code
 Number of characters in the IBAN correspond to the number specified for the country code
 BBAN format specified for the country code
 Account number, bank code and country code combination is compatible with the check digits

The check digits are calculated using MOD-97-10 as per ISO/IEC 7064:2003 (abbreviated to mod-97 in this article), which specifies a set of check character systems capable of protecting strings against errors which occur when people copy or key data. In particular, the standard states that the following can be detected:
 All single substitution errors (the substitution of a single character for another, for example 4234 for 1234)
 All or nearly all single (local) transposition errors (the transposition of two single characters, either adjacent or with one character between them, for example 12354 or 12543 for 12345)
 All or nearly all shift errors (shifts of the whole string to the left or right)
 High proportion of double substitution errors (two separate single substitution errors in the same string, for example 7234587 for 1234567)
 High proportion of all other errors

The underlying rules for IBANs is that the account-servicing financial institution should issue an IBAN, as there are a number of areas where different IBANs could be generated from the same account and branch numbers that would satisfy the generic IBAN validation rules. In particular cases where 00 is a valid check digit, 97 will not be a valid check digit, likewise, if 01 is a valid check digit, 98 will not be a valid check digit, similarly with 02 and 99.

The UN CEFACT TBG5 has published a free IBAN validation service in 32 languages for all 57 countries that have adopted the IBAN standard. They have also published the Javascript source code of the verification algorithm.

An English language IBAN checker for ECBS member country bank accounts is available on its website.

Algorithms

Validating the IBAN
An IBAN is validated by converting it into an integer and performing a basic mod-97 operation (as described in ISO 7064) on it. If the IBAN is valid, the remainder equals 1. The algorithm of IBAN validation is as follows:

 Check that the total IBAN length is correct as per the country. If not, the IBAN is invalid
 Move the four initial characters to the end of the string
 Replace each letter in the string with two digits, thereby expanding the string, where A = 10, B = 11, ..., Z = 35
 Interpret the string as a decimal integer and compute the remainder of that number on division by 97

If the remainder is 1, the check digit test is passed and the IBAN might be valid.

Example (fictitious United Kingdom bank, sort code 12-34-56, account number 98765432):

{|
|• IBAN: ||||align="right"|  1234 5698 7654 32||
|-
|• Rearrange: ||||align="right"|12345698765432||
|-
|• Convert to integer: ||||align="right"|12345698765432||
|-
|• Compute remainder: ||||align="right"|12345698765432|| mod 97 = 1
|}

Generating IBAN check digits
According to the ECBS "generation of the IBAN shall be the exclusive responsibility of the bank/branch servicing the account". The ECBS document replicates part of the ISO/IEC 7064:2003 standard as a method for generating check digits in the range 02 to 98. Check digits in the ranges 00 to 96, 01 to 97, and 03 to 99 will also provide validation of an IBAN, but the standard is silent as to whether or not these ranges may be used.

The preferred algorithm is:

 Check that the total IBAN length is correct as per the country. If not, the IBAN is invalid.
 Replace the two check digits by 00 (e.g., GB00 for the UK).
 Move the four initial characters to the end of the string.
 Replace the letters in the string with digits, expanding the string as necessary, such that A or a = 10, B or b = 11, and Z or z = 35. Each alphabetic character is therefore replaced by 2 digits
 Convert the string to an integer (i.e. ignore leading zeroes).
 Calculate mod-97 of the new number, which results in the remainder.
 Subtract the remainder from 98 and use the result for the two check digits. If the result is a single-digit number, pad it with a leading 0 to make a two-digit number.

Modulo operation on IBAN
Any computer programming language or software package that is used to compute D mod 97 directly must have the ability to handle integers of more than 30 digits. In practice, this can only be done by software that either supports arbitrary-precision arithmetic or that can handle 219-bit (unsigned) integers, features that are often not standard. If the application software in use does not provide the ability to handle integers of this size, the modulo operation can be performed in a piece-wise manner (as is the case with the UN CEFACT TBG5 JavaScript program).

Piece-wise calculation  can be done in many ways. One such way is as follows:

 Starting from the leftmost digit of D, construct a number using the first 9 digits and call it N.
 Calculate N mod 97.
 Construct a new 9-digit N by concatenating the above result (step 2) with the next 7 digits of D. If there are fewer than 7 digits remaining in D but at least one, then construct a new N, which will have less than 9 digits, from the above result (step 2) followed by the remaining digits of D
 Repeat steps 2–3 until all the digits of D have been processed

The result of the final calculation in step 2 will be D mod 97 = N mod 97.

Example
In this example, the above algorithm for D mod 97 will be applied to D = . (The digits are colour-coded to aid the description below.) If the result is one, the IBAN corresponding to D passes the check digit test.

 Construct N from the first 9 digits of D
 N = 
 Calculate N mod 97 = 70
 Construct a new 9-digit N from the above result (step 2) followed by the next 7 digits of D.
 N = 70
 Calculate N mod 97 = 29
 Construct a new 9-digit N from the above result (step 4) followed by the next 7 digits of D.
 N = 29
 Calculate N mod 97 = 24
 Construct a new N from the above result (step 6) followed by the remaining 5 digits of D.
 N = 24
 Calculate N mod 97 = 1

From step 8, the final result is D mod 97 = 1 and the IBAN has passed this check digit test.

National check digits

In addition to the IBAN check digits, many countries have their own national check digits used within the BBAN, as part of their national account number formats. Each country determines its own algorithm used for assigning and validating the national check digits - some relying on international standards, some inventing their own national standard, and some allowing each bank to decide if or how to implement them. Some algorithms apply to the entire BBAN, and others to one or more of the fields within it. The check digits may be considered an integral part of the account number, or an external field separate from the account number, depending on the country's rules.

Most of the variations used are based on two categories of algorithms:

- ISO 7064 MOD-97-10: Treat the account number as a large integer, divide it by 97 and use the remainder or its complement as the check digit(s).

- Weighted Sum: Treat the account number as a series of individual numbers, multiply each number by a weight value according to its position in the string, sum the products, divide the sum by a modulus (usually 10 or 11) and use the remainder or its complement as the check digit.

In both cases, there may first be a translation from alphanumeric characters to numbers using conversion tables.
The complement, if used, means the remainder  is subtracted from a fixed value, usually the modulus or the modulus plus one (with the common exception that a remainder of 0 results in 0, denoted as 0 → 0,as opposed to e.g. 0 → 97 meaning that if the reminder is zero the checksum is 97).
Note that some national specifications define the weights order from right to left, but since the BBAN length in the IBAN is fixed, they can be used from left to right as well.

Adoption 

International bank transactions use either an IBAN or the ISO 9362 Business Identifier Code system (BIC or SWIFT code) in conjunction with the BBAN (Basic Bank Account Number).

EEA and territories 
The banks of most countries in Europe publish account numbers using both the IBAN format and the nationally recognised identifiers, this being mandatory within the European Economic Area.

Day-to-day administration of banking in British Overseas Territories varies from territory to territory; some, such as South Georgia and the South Sandwich Islands, have too small a population to warrant a banking system while others, such as Bermuda, have a thriving financial sector. The use of the IBAN is up to the local government—Gibraltar, formerly part of the European Union is required to use the IBAN, as are the Crown Dependencies, which use the British clearing system, and the British Virgin Islands have chosen to do so. , no other British Overseas Territories have chosen to use the IBAN. Banks in the Caribbean Netherlands also do not use the IBAN.

Single Euro Payments Area

The IBAN designation scheme was chosen as the foundation for electronic straight-through processing in the European Economic Area. The European Parliament mandated that a bank charge needs to be the same amount for domestic credit transfers as for cross-border credit transfers regulated in decision 2560/2001 (updated in 924/2009). This regulation took effect in 2003. Only payments in euro up to €12,500 to a bank account designated by its IBAN were covered by the regulation, not payments in other currencies.

The Euro Payments regulation was the foundation for the decision to create a Single Euro Payments Area (SEPA). The European Central Bank has created the TARGET2 interbank network that unifies the technical infrastructure of the 26 central banks of the European Union (although Sweden has opted out). SEPA is a self-regulatory initiative by the banking sector of Europe as represented in the European Payments Council (EPC). The European Union made the scheme mandatory through the Payment Services Directive published in 2007. Since January 2008, all countries were required to support SEPA credit transfer, and SEPA direct debit was required to be supported since November 2009. The regulation on SEPA payments increased the charge cap (same price for domestic payments as for cross-border payments) to €50,000.

With a further decision of the European Parliament, the IBAN scheme for bank accounts fully replaced the domestic numbering schemes from 31 December 2012. On 16 December 2010, the European Commission published regulations that made IBAN support mandatory for domestic credit transfer by 2013 and for domestic direct debit by 2014 (with a 12 and 24 months transition period respectively). Some countries had already replaced their traditional bank account scheme by IBAN. This included Switzerland where IBAN was introduced for national credit transfer on 1 January 2006 and the support for the old bank account numbers was not required from 1 January 2010.

Based on a 20 December 2011 memorandum, the EU parliament resolved the mandatory dates for the adoption of the IBAN on 14 February 2012. On 1 February 2014, all national systems for credit transfer and direct debit were abolished and replaced by an IBAN-based system. This was then extended to all cross-border SEPA transactions on 1 February 2016 (Article 5 Section 7). After these dates the IBAN is sufficient to identify an account for home and foreign financial transactions in SEPA countries and banks are no longer permitted to require that the customer supply the BIC for the beneficiary's bank.

In the run-up to the 1 February 2014 deadline, it became apparent that many old bank account numbers had not been allocated IBANs—an issue that was addressed on a country-by-country basis. In Germany, for example, Deutsche Bundesbank and the German Banking Industry Committee required that all holders of German bank codes ("Bankleitzahl") published the specifics of their IBAN generation format taking into account not only the generation of check digits but also the handling of legacy bank codes, thereby enabling third parties to generate IBANs independently of the bank. The first such catalogue was published in June 2013 as a variant of the old bank code catalog ("Bankleitzahlendatei").

Non-EEA
Banks in numerous non-European countries including most states of the Middle East, North Africa and the Caribbean have implemented the IBAN format for account identification. In some countries the IBAN is used on an ad hoc basis, an example was Ukraine where account numbers used for international transfers by some domestic banks had additional aliases that followed the IBAN format as a precursor to formal SWIFT registration. This practice in Ukraine ended on 1 November 2019 when all Ukrainian banks had fully switched to the IBAN standard.

The degree to which a bank verifies the validity of a recipient's bank account number depends on the configuration of the transmitting bank's software—many major software packages supply bank account validation as a standard function. Some banks outside Europe may not recognize IBAN, though this is expected to diminish with time. Non-European banks usually accept IBANs for accounts in Europe, although they might not treat IBANs differently from other foreign bank account numbers. In particular, they might not check the IBAN's validity prior to sending the transfer.

Banks in the United States do not use IBAN as account numbers for U.S. accounts and use ABA routing transit numbers. Any adoption of the IBAN standard by U.S. banks would likely be initiated by ANSI ASC X9, the U.S. financial services standards development organization: a working group (X9B20) was established as an X9 subcommittee to generate an IBAN construction for U.S. bank accounts.

Canadian financial institutions have not adopted IBAN and use routing numbers issued by Payments Canada for domestic transfers, and SWIFT for international transfers. There is no formal governmental or private sector regulatory requirement in Canada for the major banks to use IBAN.

Australia and New Zealand do not use IBAN. They use Bank State Branch codes for domestic transfers and SWIFT for international transfers.

IBAN formats by country 
This table summarises the IBAN formats by country:
 The kk after the two-character ISO country code represents the check digits calculated from the rest of the IBAN characters. If it is a constant for the country concerned, this will be stated in the Comments column. This happens where the BBAN has its own check digits that use the same algorithm as the IBAN check digits
 The BBAN format column shows the format of the BBAN part of an IBAN in terms of upper case alpha characters (A–Z) denoted by "a", numeric characters (0–9) denoted by "n" and mixed case alphanumeric characters (a–z, A–Z, 0–9) denoted by "c". For example, the Bulgarian BBAN (4a,6n,8c) consists of 4 alpha characters, followed by 6 numeric characters, then by 8 mixed-case alpha-numeric characters
 Descriptions in the Comments field have been standardised with country-specific names in brackets. The format of the various fields can be deduced from the BBAN field

In addition to the above, the IBAN is under development in countries below but has not yet been catalogued for general international use.

In this list
 "kk" represent the IBAN checksum
 "a" represents an alphabetic character
 "c" represents an alphanumeric character
 "n" represents a numeric character.

See also 

 Bank card number
 Bank regulation
 ABA routing transit number
 Routing number (Canada)
 EPC QR code

Notes

References

External links 

 
 

Banking terms
Financial regulation
ISO standards
Bank codes
Checksum algorithms